San Luis Airport  is a high-elevation airport serving Ipiales, a city in the Nariño Department of Colombia. Google Earth 2015 imagery shows a second runway, 08/26, under construction.

The Ipiales VOR-DME (Ident: IPI) and San Luis non-directional beacon (Ident: SLI) are located on the field.

Airlines and destinations

Accidents and incidents
On 22 August 1975, Douglas C-49J HK-1517E of TANA was reported to have been damaged beyond economic repair.

See also
Transport in Colombia
List of airports in Colombia

References

External links 
OpenStreetMap - San Luis
OurAirports - San Luis
SkyVector - San Luis
FallingRain - San Luis Airport

Airports in Colombia
Buildings and structures in Nariño Department
Binational airports